Chuks D General (born Chukwuyem Jude Israel) is a Nigerian stand-up comedian, actor, radio presenter and host. He is best known for his spontaneous jokes. He is the host of Generally Speaking, a comedy show that hosts popular celebrities across the Nigerian entertainment industry.

Early life and education 
Chuks D General was born on February 27 in to Agbor, Delta State. He is a graduate of statistics from the Nasarawa State University, Keffi, where he served as the institution's Director of Socials. He formerly attended Staff Model Secondary School in Agbor, Delta State.

Generally Speaking
Generally Speaking, is Chuk's annual flagship show. It has recorded three outings since inception.  The show has featured celebrated names in the Nigeria's entertainment industry, such as Ali Baba, Seyi Law, and Richard Mofe-Damijo.

See also 

 List of Nigerian comedians

References

Living people
Male actors from Delta State
Nigerian male television actors
Nigerian male comedians
Nigerian television directors
Nigerian television presenters
Nigerian writers
Year of birth missing (living people)
21st-century Nigerian male actors